Havre–Caumartin is a station on Line 3 and Line 9 of the Paris Métro. It is located in the 9th arrondissement.

Location
The station is located at the intersection of Rue de Caumartin and Boulevard Haussmann, and a hundred meters east of Rue du Havre, the platforms being established:

 on line 3, along a northwest / southeast axis under the end of Rue Auber (between Saint-Lazare and Opéra metro stations);
 on line 9, approximately along an east–west axis under Boulevard Haussmann (between Saint-Augustin and Chaussée d'Antin–La Fayette).

History
Its opening dates from October 1904, with the opening of the first section of Line 3 between the Avenue de Villiers (now known simply as Villiers) and Père Lachaise. The line 9 platforms opened on 3 June 1923 with the extension of the line from Saint-Augustin to Chaussée d'Antin–La Fayette.

The station is situated at the intersection of the Rue de Caumartin and the Boulevard Haussmann, and about 100 metres from the Rue du Havre. The Rue du Havre runs in front of the Gare Saint-Lazare, which is one of the principal destinations for Paris Métro travelers from Havre-Caumartin.

The station takes the last half of its name from the Marquis de Saint-Ange, François Le Fèvre de Caumartin, who was a leading merchant of Paris during the 18th century. The station is located at one end of the street that today carries his name.

Passenger services

Access
The station has four entrances leading to Boulevard Haussmann, each consisting of a fixed staircase decorated with a pole with a yellow "M" inscribed in a circle:
 Entrance 1: Rue du Havre, to the right of the Le Printemps department store at no. 70 of the boulevard
 Entrance 2: Boulevard Haussmann – Department stores, also facing Printemps but at no. 56
 Entrance 3: Rue Auber, to the right of no.  53 of the boulevard
 Entrance 4: Rue de Caumartin, opposite no. 43 of the boulevard

Station layout

Platforms
The platforms of the two lines are of standard configuration. There are two per stopping point, they are separated by the metro tracks located in the centre.

Those of line 3 are established flush with the ground. The ceiling consists of a metal apron, the beams of which, yellow orange in colour, are supported by vertical walls. They are furnished in the Andreu-Motte style with two orange-yellow light canopies, benches, tunnels exits and walls covered with large flat white stretched sandstone tiles and yellow Motte seats. The advertisements are unframed, and the name of the station is written in Parisine font on enamel plates.

The platforms of line 9, established in a very slight curve, have an elliptical vault and are among the last of the network to have retained a Mouton-Duvernet style decoration, with walls fitted with flat bright orange tiles laid horizontally and aligned, as well as lighting canopies characteristic of this type of development. The tunnel exits are fitted with flat white tiles, also laid horizontally, and aligned, while the vault is painted in burgundy. The advertising frames are metallic, and the name of the station is written in Parisine font on enamel plates (replacing the original white embossed capital letters, typical of the Mouton style). The Motte style seats are orange in colour.

Other connections
The station is in direct correspondence with Gare d'Auber and Haussmann–Saint-Lazare stations, served respectively by RER lines A and E. It is part of the longest connection on the Paris metro, which links Saint-Augustin to Opéra by connecting several metro stations and RER stations through corridors.

The station is also served by lines 20, 21 (towards Stade Sébastien Charléty only), 27, 29, 32, 42, 66, 95 and Roissybus of the RATP Bus Network and, at night, by lines N15 and N16 of the Noctilien bus network.

Nearby
Nearby are the famous department stores of Printemps and Galeries Lafayette.

Nearby stations
The station offers connections to the following other stations:
 Auber (Paris RER) on RER line A
 Haussmann–Saint-Lazare (Paris RER) on RER line E
 Opéra on lines 3, 7 and 8
 Saint-Lazare on lines 3, 12, 13 and 14
 Saint-Augustin on line 9

Gallery

References

Roland, Gérard (2003). Stations de métro. D’Abbesses à Wagram. Éditions Bonneton.

External links
 Métro Havre-Caumartin at insecula.com

Paris Métro stations in the 9th arrondissement of Paris
Railway stations in France opened in 1904